The 2017–18 Detroit Red Wings season was the 92nd season for the National Hockey League (NHL) franchise that was established on September 25, 1926. It was also the Red Wings' first season at Little Caesars Arena. The team missed the playoffs for the second year in a row, marking the first time since 1982–83 that the Red Wings missed the playoffs in consecutive seasons.

Standings

Schedule and results

Preseason

Regular season

Player statistics

Skaters

Goaltenders

†Denotes player spent time with another team before joining the Red Wings. Stats reflect time with the Red Wings only.
‡Traded mid-season
Bold/italics denotes franchise record

Awards and honours

Milestones

Suspensions/fines

Transactions

Trades

Notes:
  Detroit to retain 50% ($2 million) of salary as part of trade.

Free agents acquired

Free agents lost

Player signings

Draft picks

Below are the Detroit Red Wings' selections at the 2017 NHL Entry Draft, which was held on June 23–24, 2017 at the United Center in Chicago, Illinois.

Draft notes
 The Florida Panthers' third-round pick went to the Detroit Red Wings as the result of a trade on March 1, 2017 that sent Thomas Vanek to Florida in exchange for Dylan McIlrath and this pick (being conditional at the time of the trade). The condition – Detroit will receive a third-round pick in 2017 if Florida fails to qualify for the 2017 Stanley Cup playoffs – was converted on March 30, 2017.
 The Toronto Maple Leafs' third-round pick went to the Detroit Red Wings as compensation for Toronto hiring Mike Babcock as their head coach on May 20, 2015.
 The New York Rangers' third-round pick went to the Detroit Red Wings as the result of a trade on February 28, 2017 that sent Brendan Smith to New York in exchange for Ottawa's second-round pick in 2018 and this pick.
 The Chicago Blackhawks' third-round pick went to the Detroit Red Wings as the result of a trade on February 24, 2017 that sent Tomas Jurco to Chicago in exchange for this pick.
 The Florida Panthers' sixth-round pick went to the Detroit Red Wings as the result of a trade on February 27, 2016 that sent Jakub Kindl to Florida in exchange for this pick.

References

Detroit Red Wings seasons
Detroit Red Wings
Detroit Red
Detroit Red